Henry Eastham (30 June 1917 – September 1998) was an English professional footballer who played as an inside forward. Active between 1934 and 1954, Eastham made over 250 appearances in the Football League.

Early life
Harry Eastham was born on 30 June 1917 in Blackpool. His elder brother was fellow player George Eastham, Sr.; George's own son – Harry's nephew – George, Jr. was also a professional player.

Career
After graduating through the youth team of hometown club Blackpool, Eastham turned professional in 1934. He also played in the Football League for Liverpool, Tranmere Rovers and Accrington Stanley, before moving to play non-league football with Netherfield and Rolls Royce.

External links

LFC History
Obituary - AFS

1917 births
1998 deaths
English footballers
Blackpool F.C. players
Liverpool F.C. players
Tranmere Rovers F.C. players
Accrington Stanley F.C. (1891) players
English Football League players
Rolls Royce Leisure F.C. players
Kendal Town F.C. players
Sportspeople from Blackpool
Association football inside forwards